John Richard Wiegand (February 23, 1912 - December 1986) discovered the Wiegand effect, a physical phenomenon in which a special wire, called a "Wiegand wire", produces small magnetic fields.  The accompanying Wiegand reader detects the magnetic pulses produced by the two-domain wire embedded within, typically, plastic cards.  There is also a Wiegand interface commonly used to transmit the data collected by a Wiegand sensor in a card reader. The Wiegand effect was first thought to be a commercially viable solution to better ignition systems for internal combustion engines.  Echlin Corporation, an automotive parts manufacturer owned Sensor Engineering of Hamden, Connecticut in the 1970s.  That application was displaced by the electronic ignition system.

References

United States Patent 3780313 First Wiegand Pulse Generator
United States Patent 3892118 Where it all Started July 1, 1975
United States Patent 4247601
United States Patent 4263523
United States Patent 4484090
United States Patent 4309628

American physicists
1912 births
1986 deaths